The Wiriyamu Massacre or Operation Marosca was a massacre of the civilian population of the village of Wiriyamu in Mozambique by Portuguese soldiers in December 1972.

In September 2022 Portuguese prime minister António Costa considered it 'an unforgivable act that dishonours Portugal history'.

Background

The Portuguese Colonial War broke out in 1961 in response to challenges to Portuguese colonial rule by African independence movements following the success of Democratic Republic of the Congo obtaining independence from Belgium a year earlier. In 1970, FRELIMO guerillas began operating along the Mozambican section of the Zambezi River. The presence of FRELIMO and other anti-colonial revolutionary guerilla organisations sparked intense and widespread panic among settlers. In response, the Portuguese Army initiated in 1971 a series of "cleanup" operations along the Zambezi, from Mucanha to Mucumbura to Inhambinga. These operations involved widespread atrocities and the depopulating of the area to block the advance of guerillas, who relied on support from the local African populace. By 1972, the Portuguese government deployed large amounts of Army units and PIDE/DGS corps to the area, with their behaviour and that of the settler militias becoming increasingly harsh.

Massacre
On 16 December 1972, the Portuguese 6th company of Mozambique Commandos killed the inhabitants of the village of Wiriyamu, in the district of Tete. Referred to as the 'Wiriyamu Massacre', the soldiers killed between 150 (according to the Red Cross) and 300 (according to a much later investigation by the Portuguese newspaper Expresso based in testimonies from soldiers) villagers accused of sheltering FRELIMO guerrillas. 

The action, named "Operation Marosca", was planned at the instigation of PIDE/DGS agents and guided by agent Chico Kachavi, who was later assassinated while an inquiry into the events was being carried out. The soldiers were told by this agent that "the orders were to kill them all", never mind that only civilians, women and children included, were found. All of the victims were civilians.

Aftermath
The massacre was recounted in July 1973 by the British Catholic priest, Father Adrian Hastings, and two other Spanish missionary priests. Later counter-claims have been made in a report of Archbishop of Dar es Salaam Laurean Rugambwa that alleged that the killings were carried out by FRELIMO combatants, not Portuguese forces. In addition, others claimed that the alleged massacres by Portuguese military forces were fabricated to tar the reputation of the Portuguese state abroad. Portuguese journalist Felícia Cabrita reconstructed the Wiriyamu massacre in detail by interviewing both survivors and former members of the Portuguese Army Commandos, the unit that carried out the massacre. Cabrita's report was published in the Portuguese weekly newspaper Expresso and later in a book containing several of the journalist's articles.

References

Further reading
 .

Massacres in Mozambique
Mozambican War of Independence
December 1972 crimes
December 1972 events in Africa
1970s in Mozambique
Massacres in 1972